Végennes is a commune in the Corrèze department in central France in the Nouvelle-Aquitaine region.

Geography

Location
The commune is located in the south of the Corrèze department. The village borders the department of the Lot and the Occitanie region.

Population

History
In 856 at Veterinas, as Végennes was called, Rodolphe de Turenne, Archbishop of Bourges established a Benedictine settlement there. It would fail and he moved the settlement to Vellinus which he renamed Bellus Locus that eventually became Beaulieu-sur-Dordogne.

Notable persons
 Jacques Ricard de Genouillac, dit Galiot de Genouillac - military and French diplomat during the Renaissance, died at Végennes on 15 October 1546

See also
Communes of the Corrèze department

References

Communes of Corrèze
Corrèze communes articles needing translation from French Wikipedia